Guldborgsund is a municipality (Danish, kommune) in Region Sjælland in Denmark, created on 1 January 2007 from six (6) former municipalities on the two islands Lolland in the west and Falster in the east bordering the Guldborgsund strait. It covers an area of 903.15 km² (2013) and has a total population of 60,310 (1. January 2022). Its neighboring municipalities are Lolland to the west and Vordingborg to the north. Its administrative seat is in the town of Nykøbing Falster. Its mayor as of 1 January 2022 is Simon Hansen, representing the Social Democrats.

The southernmost point in Denmark, Gedser Odde, is located in the municipality.

History
On Monday January 1, 2007 Guldborgsund municipality was created as the result of Kommunalreformen ("The Municipal Reform" of 2007), consisting of the six (6) former municipalities of Nykøbing Falster (located partly on the island of Falster and partly on Lolland (its Sundby section)), Nørre Alslev (Falster), Stubbekøbing (Falster), and Sydfalster (Falster) and two of the six former municipalities located on the island of Lolland: Sakskøbing and Nysted.

Politics
Guldborgsund's municipal council consists of 29 members, elected every four years. The municipal council has six political committees.

Municipal council
Below are the municipal councils elected since the Municipal Reform of 2007.

Economy
The largest company headquartered in the municipality is Codan Medical  in Nysted, although its activities are actually concentrated in Rødbyhavn in neighbouring Lolland Municipality.

Localities

Tourism

Among the largest tourist attraction in the municipality is Middelaldercentret just outside Nykøbing Falster, which is an open-air museum built as a medieval town with houses and weaponry from around 1400. In Nysted is Aalholm, which is a privately owned castle. Fuglsang Art Museum holds a notable collection of Danish art from the end of the 18th century until today. In Marielyst on eastern Falster is a large summer house area and long sandy beaches.

Twin towns – sister cities

Guldborgsund is twinned with:
 Eutin, Germany
 Iisalmi, Finland
 Liepāja, Latvia
 Rostock, Germany

References

External links 

 Guldborgsund municipality's official website 
 Municipal statistics: NetBorger Kommunefakta, delivered from KMD aka Kommunedata (Municipal Data)
 Municipal mergers and neighbors: Eniro new municipalities map

 
Municipalities of Region Zealand
Municipalities of Denmark
Populated places established in 2007